Tomás Carbonell and Petr Korda defeated Shane Barr and Hubert Karrasch in the final, 6–1, 6–1 to win the boys' doubles tennis title at the 1986 Wimbledon Championships.

Seeds

  Omar Camporese /  Eugenio Rossi (quarterfinals)
  Nuno Marques /  Nicolás Pereira (second round)
  Chris Bailey /  Austen Brice (first round)
  Florentino Anda /  Javier Sánchez (quarterfinals)
  Glen Schaap /  Jacco Van Duyn (second round)
  Tomas Nydahl /  Patrik Wennberg (first round)
  Sergio Cortés /  Alberto Mancini (first round)
  Byron Black /  Marcelo Saliola (first round)

Draw

Finals

Top half

Bottom half

References

External links

Boys' Doubles
Wimbledon Championship by year – Boys' doubles